The following television stations operate on virtual channel 3 in Canada:

 CBHT-DT in Halifax, Nova Scotia
 CBWFT-DT in Winnipeg, Manitoba
 CFRN-DT in Edmonton, Alberta
 CHAU-DT-1 in Sainte-Marguerite-Marie, Quebec
 CHAU-DT-11 in Kedgwick, New Brunswick
 CIMT-DT-8 in Cabano, Quebec
 CKVR-DT in Barrie, Ontario

03 virtual TV stations in Canada